North Richland Hills, commonly known as NRH, is a city inside Tarrant County, Texas, United States, and a mid-to-high end suburb of Fort Worth. The population was 69,917 at the 2020 census, making it the third largest city in Tarrant County. In 2006, North Richland Hills was selected as one of the “Top 100 Best Places to live in America” according to Money magazine, and in 2016, the Dallas Morning News ranked North Richland Hills #9 on its list of best Dallas–Fort Worth neighborhoods. Major streets and highways include: FM 1938 (Davis Boulevard), Mid Cities Boulevard, Bedford-Euless Road, Interstate Highway 820, North Tarrant Parkway, FM 3029 (Precinct Line Road), and TX SH 26. It is home to the Birdville Independent School District, and the northern portion is served by Keller ISD.

NRH notably houses the headquarters of HealthMarkets. North Richland Hills features popular businesses and locations, including the NRH20 Water Park, Medical City North Hills, and its own state-of-the-art public library. Additionally, NRH is surrounded by numerous communities, such as Haltom City, Keller, Hurst, and Southlake. It also housed the now-demolished North Hills Mall, which ceased operations in 2004. As of 2016, that site is now the new location of the North Richland Hills City Hall. In 2012, North Richland Hills was ranked at #44 as one of the Best Dallas Suburbs according to D Magazine.

History
The community began when W.S. Peters agreed to bring 600 families into the area within a three-year period as part of a land grant. Families began arriving in the summer of 1848. In 1849, Tarrant County was established and named for General Edward H. Tarrant. The community of Birdville (adjacent to what is now the southwest boundary of North Richland Hills) was named the first county seat. The area remained a rural farming and ranching community for more than 100 years.

In 1952, Clarence Jones began to subdivide his  dairy farm into a suburban addition in the area that is now Cummings Drive. In 1953, the North Richland Hills Civic League sought to have the area annexed to Richland Hills, then voted to form their own city when annexation was denied.

The first section of streets in North Richland Hills was named for the local families. The second section, which was added in 1954, was named for automobiles. There were 188 homes in the first part of the subdivision, which was restricted to brick and masonry construction.

By 1957, the North Richland Hills' boundary was within  of Smithfield, and by 1960, Smithfield had been annexed into North Richland Hills. In 1960, the population of North Richland Hills was beginning to rise at 8,662 residents, with that number more than doubling to 16,514 by 1970. The city's population continued to grow at a rapid pace, with the 1980 census at 30,592, and the 1990 census reflecting 45,895. In 2000, the population was at 55,635, and rise to 63,343 at the 2010 census. In 2020, the population was at 69,917.

Government

Local government
North Richland Hills operates under a charter adopted in 1964, which provides for a “Council-Manager” form of government. The Council is composed of a Mayor and seven Council Members elected at large. The Council determines the overall goals and objectives for the City, establishes policies, and adopts the City's annual operating budget. The City Manager oversees the day-to-day operations of the City.

The structure of the management and coordination of city services is:

The city of North Richland Hills is a voluntary member of the North Central Texas Council of Governments association, the purpose of which is to coordinate individual and collective local governments, and facilitate regional solutions, eliminate unnecessary duplication, and enable joint decisions.

Economy

Top employers
According to the City's 2021 Comprehensive Annual Financial Report,

The city is also home to the state's largest Ford dealership, Five Star Ford, which employs over 250 people.

Geography
North Richland Hills is located at  (32.855666, –97.218184).

Notable people
 Mark Brooks, professional golfer and 1996 PGA Champion.
 Sandra Brown, novelist and bestselling author of romance, thriller, and suspense books.
 Trenton Clark, baseball player, drafted by Milwaukee Brewers in the first round of the 2015 MLB Draft.
 Kambri Crews, author of Burn Down the Ground: A Memoir, in which North Richland Hills is featured.
 Clint Ford, actor, voice over artist, and writer.
 Logan Henderson, actor and singer, known for his role on Nickelodeon's show Big Time Rush.
 Mike Holloway, winner of Survivor: Worlds Apart, the 30th season of Survivor.
 Alex Lambert, a top-16 finalist during season 9 of singing competition show American Idol.
 Craig Lancaster, journalist and novelist whose notable works include: 600 Hours of Edward, The Summer Son, Edward Adrift, The Fallow Season of Hugo Hunter, This is What I Want.
 Whitney Lynn, contemporary multi-media artist.
 Gary Morris, country music artist, actor.
 Betty Pariso, IFBB professional bodybuilder.

Demographics

2020 census

As of the 2020 United States census, there were 69,917 people, 27,200 households, and 18,919 families residing in the city.

2010 census
As of the census of 2010, there were 63,343 people, 24,854 households, and 17,291 families residing in the city. The population density was 3,463.3 people per square mile (1,337.2/km2). There were 26,395 housing units, at an average density of 1,443.1 per square mile (557.2/km2). The racial makeup of the city was 83.8% White, 4.8% African American, 0.7% Native American, 2.8% Asian, 0.1% Pacific Islander, 5.1% from other races, and 2.7% from two or more races. Hispanic or Latino of any race were 15.6% of the population.

There were 24,854 households, out of which 30.8% had children under the age of 18 living with them, 52.9% were married couples living together, 11.9% had a female householder with no husband present, and 30.4% were non-families. 24.8% of all households were made up of individuals, and 8.6% had someone living alone who was 65 years of age or older. The average household size was 2.54, and the average family size was 3.03.

In the city, the population was spread out, with 26.7% under the age of 20, 6.3% from 20 to 24, 26.6% from 25 to 44, 28.1% from 45 to 64, and 12.3% who were 65 years of age or older. The median age was 38.1 years. For every 100 females, there were 94.2 males. For every 100 females age 20 and over, there were 90.1 males.

The median income for a household in the city was $63,806, and the median income for a family was $74,866. The per capita income for the city was $30,890. About 6.6% of families and 7.5% of the population were below the poverty line, including 11.7% of those under age 18, and 4.3% of those age 65 or over.

Education
Children who live in North Richland Hills attend schools in the Birdville Independent School District. The northernmost part of the city is served by the Keller Independent School District. North Richland Hills has two public high schools: Richland High School and Birdville High School.

Private schools in North Richland Hills include: Fort Worth Christian School, St. John the Apostle Catholic School (of the Roman Catholic Diocese of Fort Worth), North Park Christian Academy, and North Richland Hills Montessori.

The Tarrant County College Northeast Campus is located on the North Richland Hills and Hurst border at 828 Harwood Road.

Public services

North Richland Hills Fire Department / Emergency Medical Services

The North Richland Hills Fire Department (NRHFD), also called the North Richland Hills Fire-Rescue (NRHFR), is a public health service geared towards combating uncontrolled fires. In addition to its role as a fire department, it acts like a traditional EMS service, and is dispatched to a wide range of medical emergencies unrelated to fires. To accomplish this mix of roles, all NRHFD staff are cross trained as firefighters and paramedics; likewise, all vehicles that they employ carry advanced life support equipment.

The department is currently recognized as a “Best Practices” department by the Texas Fire Chiefs Association.

References

External links
 City of North Richland Hills official website
 Birdville Independent School District
 Keller Independent School District

 
Dallas–Fort Worth metroplex
Cities in Texas
Cities in Tarrant County, Texas
Populated places established in 1953